The 2020 mid-year rugby union internationals (also known as the summer internationals in the Northern Hemisphere) were international rugby union matches that were planned to be played during the July international window. They were all postponed or cancelled due to the COVID-19 pandemic.

Series
France and Wales are to tour Argentina and New Zealand respectively as they did in 2016. They will both play a two-test series as France did four years prior, but unlike Wales as they played New Zealand three times. Ireland are again to tour Australia like they did in 2018, but this time would also play two tests instead of their previous three.

Other tours
Italy are to play Argentina while Scotland are to play New Zealand on 18 July.

Fixtures

May

June

3 July

4 July

11 July

18 July

See also
 2020 end-of-year rugby union internationals

Notes

References

2019
2019–20 in European rugby union
2020 in South American rugby union
2020 in New Zealand rugby union
2019–20 in Japanese rugby union
July